Claudio Alberto Morresi (born 30 April 1962 in Buenos Aires) is an Argentine former footballer and politician. He has served as Sports Secretary of Argentina, and currently serves as a member of the Buenos Aires City Legislature. He is a member of the Kolina party.

Career
Born in Buenos Aires, Morresi formed with Enzo Francescoli one of the best striking partnerships in soccer at the River Plate football club in the early 1980s.

Morresi played for Argentina at the 1981 FIFA World Youth Championship finals in Australia.

Titles

References

External links

1962 births
Living people
Argentine footballers
Argentine sportsperson-politicians
Footballers from Buenos Aires
Argentine Primera División players
Liga MX players
Club Atlético Huracán footballers
Club Atlético River Plate footballers
Independiente Santa Fe footballers
Club Atlético Vélez Sarsfield footballers
Santos Laguna footballers
Club Atlético Platense footballers
Club Atlético Huracán managers
Argentine expatriate footballers
Expatriate footballers in Mexico
Argentina under-20 international footballers
Argentina youth international footballers
Association football midfielders
Argentine football managers
Kolina politicians
Members of the Buenos Aires City Legislature